Iram Qureshi is a British film and TV producer, director and media academic. She is the recipient of 1st Indus Drama Awards and PTV Awards. Iram has also been an Assistant Examiner at the University of Cambridge since 2011 and the Associate Lecturer at the University of Bath.

Education
Qureshi did her television production internship, a part of her MSc in Communication Sciences at Combine media in 2000.

Career
She is the founder of KQ Movies, a London-based film production company and the MD of Evergreen Productions. Apart from her career as a film and television producer, she has also been an assistant examiner at the University of Cambridge since 2011. Her PhD in Film and Television titled, The Stranger Left No Card: A Critical Analysis of Wendy Toye’s work as a Woman Director in British Cinema and Television, was archival research and the first sustained analysis of a pioneering woman director from 1950s British cinema, at Brunel University London. Currently, she is working on a WWI period drama The Woman with the Torch - Elsie Inglis' War on the life of Elsie Maud Inglis, the founder of Scottish Women's Hospitals for Foreign Service.

Filmography

Awards

Academic theses

References

Living people
British mass media scholars
British non-fiction writers
Alumni of Brunel University London
British scholars
British women film directors
British women film producers
British television directors
British film producers
Year of birth missing (living people)